Nathalie Lefebvre (born T'Sobbel on 20 January 1977), known under the name of Melody, is a Belgian former singer. Although from Flanders, she sang mostly in French.

Biography
Lefebvre was born at Ronse, Belgium. Discovered by Jean-Pierre Millers, Melody was produced by Dalida's brother, Orlando. In 1989, at the age of 12, she released her first single "Y'a pas que les grands qui rêvent", written by J.-P. Millers and Guy Carlier, which was a huge hit in France (#2, 28 weeks on the chart) and won an SACEM award. She also released other songs such as "Chariot d'étoiles", "Le Prince du roller" and "Mamie", which achieved a minor success.

She recorded an album in 1990, Danse ta vie, which was reissued in 1993 and containing two new songs. However, it passed unnoticed.

Discography

Albums
 Danse ta vie
 Une Flèche en plein cœur
 Mon Cœur

Singles
 "Y'a pas que les grands qui rêvent" - #2 in France, Gold disc
 "Chariot d'étoiles" - #15 in France
 "Le Prince du roller"
 "Mamie"
 "Avoir 15 ans"
 "Djami"
 "Laissez-moi partir"
 "La Passoire à mensonges"
 "Adolescence"
 "Métamorphose"
 "Envie de tout"

References

1977 births
Living people
French-language singers of Belgium
21st-century Belgian women singers
21st-century Belgian singers